MacKillop College is an independent Roman Catholic secondary day and boarding school for girls located in Bathurst, New South Wales, Australia.

The college was established in 1967 at the Diocesan Catholic Girls' High School.

See also 

 List of Catholic schools in New South Wales
 List of boarding schools in Australia
 Catholic education in Australia

References

External links 
 MacKillop College website
 MacKillop College Facebook group

1967 establishments in Australia
Education in Bathurst, New South Wales
Boarding schools in New South Wales
Educational institutions established in 1967
Girls' schools in New South Wales
Catholic secondary schools in New South Wales
Catholic boarding schools in Australia
Roman Catholic Diocese of Bathurst in Australia
Alliance of Girls' Schools Australasia